Australia
 Aleks Marić
Argentina
 Marcelo Nicola
  Pepe Sánchez
 Hugo Sconochini
Belgium
 Matt Lojeski
Bosnia and Herzegovina
 Saša Marković
 Haris Mujezinović
 Zack Wright
Bulgaria
 Hristo Zahariev
Canada
 Wayne Yearwood
 Tom Kappos
 Andy Rautins
Central African Republic
 Romain Sato
Cameroon 
 Paris Lee
Croatia
 Jurica Golemac
 Mario Hezonja
 Arijan Komazec
 Nikola Prkačin
 Dino Rađja
 Damir Mulaomerović
 Roko Ukić
 Stojko Vranković
 Jurica Žuža
 Andrija Žižić
China
 Shang Ping
Cuba
 Howard Sant-Roos
Dominican Republic
 James Feldeine
Egypt
 Nikos Chougkaz
Estonia
 Aivar Kuusmaa
 Tiit Sokk
Gabon
 Stéphane Lasme
Germany
 Patrick Femerling
 Sascha Hupmann
 Michael Koch
Georgia
 Giorgi Shermadini
 MarQuez Haynes
 Alexandros Samodurov
Ghana
 Ben Bentil
Great Britain
 John Amaechi
 Johnny Branch
 Ian Vougioukas
Greece
 Fragiskos Alvertis
 Liveris Andritsos
 Thanasis Antetokounmpo
 Zach Auguste
 Neoklis Avdalas
 Giorgos Balogiannis
 Giorgos Bogris
 Nikos Boudouris
 Ioannis Bourousis
 Mike Bramos
 Fanis Christodoulou
 Nick Calathes
 Pat Calathes
 Dimitris Diamantidis
 Dimos Dikoudis
 Dimitris Dimakopoulos
  Nikos Diplaros
 Antonis Fotsis
 Nikos Galis
 Ioannis Giannoulis
 Panagiotis Giannakis
 Nikos Chatzivrettas
 Memos Ioannou
 Kostas Kaimakoglou
 Georgios Kalaitzakis
 Panagiotis Kalaitzakis
 Giorgos Kalaitzis
 Leonidas Kaselakis
 Vassilis Kavvadas
 Dimitris Kokolakis
 Giorgos Kolokithas
 Apostolos Kontos
 John Korfas
 Takis Koroneos
 Lefteris Mantzoukas
 Nikos Milas
 Christos Myriounis
 Faidon Matthaiou
 Loukas Mavrokefalidis
 Nikos Oikonomou
 Lazaros Papadopoulos
 Dimitris Papanikolaou
 Kostas Patavoukas
 Argiris Papapetrou
 Ioannis Papapetrou
 Nikos Pappas
 Argyris Pedoulakis
 Stratos Perperoglou
 Nikos Persidis
 Kostas Politis
 David Stergakos
 Sofoklis Schortsanitis
 Tzanis Stavrakopoulos
 Vassilis Spanoulis
 Kostas Tsartsaris
 George Vassilakopoulos
 Vassilis Xanthopoulos
  Fotios Zoumpos
Ireland
 Pat Burke
Israel
 Oded Kattash
Italy
 Ferdinando Gentile
 Alessandro Gentile
 Enzo Capogna
Latvia
 Jānis Blūms
Lebanon
 Rony Seikaly
Lithuania
 Marius Grigonis
 Artūras Gudaitis
 Šarūnas Jasikevičius
 Robertas Javtokas
 Lukas Lekavičius
 Jonas Mačiulis
 Ramūnas Šiškauskas
Montenegro
 Nikola Peković
 Aleksandar Pavlović
 Vlado Šćepanović
 Tyrese Rice
 Kendrick Perry
Nigeria
 Julius Nwosu
 Etinosa Erevbenagie
  Gani Lawal
North Macedonia
 Jacob Wiley
Poland
  David Logan
  A.J. Slaughter
 Mateusz Ponitka
Portugal
 Jason Kapono
Serbia
 Dejan Bodiroga
 Vlado Janković
 Stefan Jović
 Dušan Kecman
  Ognjen Kuzmić
 Nemanja Nedović
  DeMarcus Nelson
 Žarko Paspalj
 Miroslav Pecarski
 Miroslav Raduljica
 Željko Rebrača
 Dušan Šakota
 Milenko Tepić
 Dejan Tomašević
 Miloš Vujanić
Slovenia
 Ariel McDonald
 Sani Bečirovič
 Jaka Lakovič
 Jurica Golemac
Spain
 Ferran Martínez
 Johnny Rogers
 Darryl Middleton
Sweden
 R.T. Guinn
Turkey
 İbrahim Kutluay
Ukraine
 Alexander Volkov
United States
 Andrew Andrews
 Hilton Armstrong
 Anthony Avent
 Dwayne Bacon
 Marcus Banks
 Mike Batiste
 Lonny Baxter
 T. J. Bray
 Rion Brown
 Rodney Buford
  D.J. Cooper
  Ramel Curry
 Antonio Davis
 Tony Delk
 Marcus Denmon
 Alpha Diallo
 Byron Dinkins
 Jeremy Evans
 Yogi Ferrell
 Jehyve Floyd
 Marcus Foster
 Jimmer Fredette
 Kenny Gabriel
 James Gist
 Marcus Haislip
 Brandon Hunter
 Vince Hunter
 Pierre Jackson
 Mike James
 Edgar Jones
 Wesley Johnson
  Derwin Kitchen
 Sean Kilpatrick
 Keith Langford
 Shelvin Mack
 Daryl Macon
 Raymar Morgan
 Tracy Murray
 Drew Nicholas
 Demetris Nichols
 Andy Panko
 Adreian Payne
 Scott Roth
 K.C. Rivers
 John Salley
 Byron Scott
 Peyton Siva
 Chris Singleton
 Steven Smith
 Keifer Sykes
 Deshaun Thomas
 Matt Thomas
 Nate Wolters
 Dominique Wilkins
 Derrick Williams
 Elliot Williams
 Kennedy Winston
 Aaron White
 Okaro White
 Julian Wright
Uruguay
 Esteban Batista
Greek men's basketball players
Panathinaikos
Panathinaikos